Riley (1887 – July 1, 1910) was a bay colt sired by Longfellow out of Geneva. He won the 1890 Kentucky Derby for owner and trainer Edward Corrigan who shortly after would build Hawthorne Race Course which opened in Cicero, Illinois in 1891. Ridden by future U.S. Racing Hall of Fame inductee Isaac Murphy, Riley won the mile and one-quarter Derby in  2 minutes 45 seconds, the slowest time recorded to that point due to a very muddy track. Riley was originally named Shortfellow and had a relatively long and successful career in which he had 64 starts with 30 wins, 17 places, and 4 shows.

Riley died on July 1, 1910 at the age of 23 while being cared for by a racehorse rescue association.

Riley's only offspring of note was his daughter, Hurley Burley, who was the dam of Burgomaster, a successful sire.

Pedigree

References

1887 racehorse births
1910 racehorse deaths
Racehorses bred in Kentucky
Racehorses trained in the United States
Kentucky Derby winners
Thoroughbred family A1